"Who's That Girl (She's Got It)" is a 1985 song by English new wave/synthpop band A Flock of Seagulls from their 1986 album Dream Come True. The cover of the 7" and 12" singles came in red, blue, yellow, black, and white versions with the front including a picture of Lauren Bacall. Some pressings came on red vinyl with a "hits medley". The song reached No. 66 in the UK despite the album not charting. It was their last single to chart in the UK. The song has a BPM of 144 and plays in 4/4 time signature. Author Dave Thompson notes that the song "marked the end of the classic Seagulls line-up".

Critical reception 

On its release, Nancy Culp of Record Mirror commented, "To even have the same title as the seminal Eurythmics stunner is sacrilege. To soil its memory with piffle is an even greater crime."

Charts

Weekly charts

References 

1985 songs
1985 singles
A Flock of Seagulls songs
Jive Records singles